WWI usually refers to World War I.

WWI may also refer to:
 West Wickham railway station, London, by National Rail station code
 Woodie Woodie Airport, Western Australia, by IATA code

See also 
 WW1 (album)
 WWII (disambiguation)